Koskenniemi may refer to:

 Heikki Koskenniemi (born 1919), Finnish scholar (philology)
 Inna Koskenniemi (1923–1995), Finnish professor in the University of Turku
 Kimmo Koskenniemi (born 1945), Finnish professor
 Martti Koskenniemi (born 1953), Finnish lawyer and diplomat
 Matti Koskenniemi (1908–2001), Finnish professor (pedagogy)
 Niilo Koskenniemi (1926–1988), member of the Finnish parliament (SKDL)
 Teodor Koskenniemi (1887–1965), Finnish athlete
 Veikko Antero Koskenniemi (1885–1962), Finnish poet

Finnish-language surnames